Helen Baker, (born 18 April 1948 in England) is an English author.

Baker studied economics at the University of York before obtaining  a bilingual secretarial certificate from the City of London College and a Certificate of Education from Wolverhampton Technical Teachers' College. She is best known for her books concerning personal finance, particularly Money Matters For Women (1993) published by Penguin, later updated as Wealth For Women (2005): Another major theme in her work is Teaching English as a Foreign Language in such books as Teaching A Frenchman English - In and Out of Bed (2011) and  English - Laugh And Learn (2006).

More recently she has written eight novels based on Jane Austen's books, continuations like Playfulness (2008), a continuation of Jane Austen's Mansfield Park, completions like The Brothers By Jane Austen And Another Lady (2011) and a complete revamping like Miss Jane Austen's Lady Susan – Revived (2010). She has also published many travelogues, drawing on her own experience as an expatriate.

Biography
Baker's first published book Money Matters For Women (1993) draws on her experiences as a qualified Inspector of Taxes in the public sector and as a technical taxation manager in the private sector as well as  later in the New Zealand academic world, as a lecturer in taxation, both direct and by correspondence,

Baker studied at the University of York, obtaining a BA (with honours) in 1969. She immediately started on a post-graduate bilingual secretarial course, at the City of London College. She  received a Certificate of Education from Wolverhampton Technical Teachers' College while working as an economics lecturer. Baker went on to join the British Civil Service as a Direct Entrant at the Department of Inland Revenue. She spent four years there as an Inspector of Taxes. From 1979 to 1986 she was Technical Taxation Manager with a firm of Chartered Accountants. She moved to New Zealand in 1986 and worked as a taxation lecturer at the Technical Correspondence Institute the local equivalent to Britain's Open University.

Apart from her Regency Romances, Baker's fictional works tend to feature the same locale in Southern France where she has been living for over twenty years.

Bibliography

Fiction
Connivance — 2007
Maria – Jane Austen's Northanger Abbey Continued  — 2011
Miss Jane Austen's Lady Susan – Revived — 2010
Playfulness — 2008
Precipitation – A Continuation of Miss Jane Austen's Pride And Prejudice — 2010
The Book of Ruth — 2006
The Brothers By Jane Austen And Another Lady — 2009
The Substitute Bride — 2005
The Watsons By Jane Austen And Another Lady — 2008
The Wordlecombe Angel  — 2001
Woman Out To Grass — 2001

Non-fiction
 Comfort — 2006
 Donald Baker Countryman — 2005
 English - Laugh and Learn — 2006
 Far South with Koninklijke Luchtvaart Maatschappij — 2006
 Going For Gold – The Expatriate's Financial Handbook — 1994
 How To Thrive On A Quarter Of Your Income — 1994
 Money Matters For Women — 1993
 North East and Far East in 2007 — 2008
 Sin City For the Over-Sixties Bogota 2011 — 2011
 Teaching A Frenchman English – In and Out of Bed — 2008
 The Land of the Long White Lie — 2006
 The Man Who Was Born Too Late — 2000
 Wealth For Women — 2006
 Two Lost Souls in Seoul 2011 — 2011
 Under The Rainbow — 2009
 My French Garden — 2012

References
 The Substitute Bride 
 Money Matters For Women 
 The Land of the Long White Lie 
 The Book of Ruth 
 Teaching A Frenchman English – In and Out of Bed 
 Playfulness 
 English - Laugh and Learn 
 Connivance 
 Donald Baker Countryman

External links
       Penguin
        Barnes and Noble
        Apple iTunes
        English Laugh And Learn
       Helen Baker's website

1948 births
Living people
Alumni of the University of York
English women novelists
21st-century English novelists